Hazwan bin Hamzah (born 9 September 1991) is a Bruneian international footballer who plays as a defender for Kasuka FC of the Brunei Super League. He previously played for Rimba Star FC, Indera SC as well as DPMM FC, and was part of the Brunei Under-21 team that won the 2012 Hassanal Bolkiah Trophy.

Club career
Hazwan was a former student at Brunei's Sports School. He first started playing league football with Rimba Star FC in the 2011 Brunei Premier League II and was even made captain of the club based in Kampong Rimba.

After his involvement with the national team winded down in 2014, Hazwan linked up with local powerhouse Indera SC of the Brunei Super League and won the championship in his first season. He stayed at Indera until 2017, joining Brunei's sole professional club DPMM FC after a short trial.

Hazwan made his DPMM debut in the 4–0 loss against Albirex Niigata Singapore FC on 16 June 2017 as a second-half substitute. In the game against Home United on 8 September, he was shown a second yellow card but was not immediately sent off until after two minutes elapsed when the referee was duly reminded to do so. After 13 league appearances in total, Hazwan was released after the season concluded.

Hazwan rejoined Indera SC in time for the FA Cup semi-final against Kasuka FC in March 2018. He finally won an FA Cup medal by beating MS PDB in the final by 2 goals to nil. He left the club to join DPMM for a second time in February 2019. The 2019 season was a successful one for Hazwan as he made 11 league appearances as DPMM became champions by September.

The COVID-19 pandemic forced the club to play domestically for the next two seasons. Competing in the 2022 Brunei FA Cup, Hazwan and his team managed to go all the way to the final on 4 December against Kasuka FC where they emerged 2–1 victors and secured the club's as well as his personal second FA Cup triumph.

International career
Hazwan played for Brunei under-21s at the 2012 Hassanal Bolkiah Trophy, starting in their first-ever final appearance against Indonesia and emerging as 2-0 victors. A year later, he played with roughly the same team at the 2013 SEA Games held in Myanmar where Brunei under-23 failed to gain a single point in four matches.

Hazwan made his full international debut at the 2018 World Cup qualifying First Round for AFC against Chinese Taipei at Kaohsiung, as a second-half substitute for Shahrazen Said. Brunei took home a 1-0 result courtesy of an Adi Said goal in the 36th minute. Hazwan started the second leg in place of Azwan Ali Rahman at home ground Hassanal Bolkiah National Stadium to protect the advantage but a 0-2 reverse meant that Brunei was knocked out of the 2018 World Cup.

Hazwan made two further appearances for the national team in friendlies against Singapore and Cambodia later that year. He was earmarked for the 2016 AFC Solidarity Cup held in neighbouring Malaysia but did not make the final squad.

Hazwan was part of the Brunei squad to face Timor-Leste for the 2018 AFF Suzuki Cup qualification. He started the first leg held in Kuala Lumpur on 1 September in a 3–1 loss. Seven days later in Bandar Seri Begawan, he was a late substitute for Helmi Zambin in the second leg, the match finished 1–0 to the Wasps. Brunei ultimately failed to qualify for the Suzuki Cup, losing 2–3 on aggregate.

Hazwan was selected and started the friendly match away against Laos on 27 March 2022 which resulted in a 3–2 loss for the Wasps.

Honours

Club
Indera SC
Brunei Super League: 2014
Piala Sumbangsih (2): 2015, 2018
Brunei FA Cup: 2017–18
DPMM FC
Singapore Premier League: 2019
 Brunei FA Cup: 2022

Individual
 
  Meritorius Service Medal (PJK) (2012)

References

External links

1991 births
Living people
Association football defenders
Bruneian footballers
Brunei international footballers
DPMM FC players
Indera SC players
Competitors at the 2013 Southeast Asian Games
Singapore Premier League players
Southeast Asian Games competitors for Brunei